Kriva bara is a village in northwestern Bulgaria.  It is located in the Brusartsi Municipality of the Montana Province.

A village of the same name also exists in the Kozloduy municipality of the Vratsa Province in Bulgaria.

References

Villages in Montana Province